Dmitri Nikolayevich Cheryshev (born 11 May 1969) is a Russian former professional footballer who played as a forward, and a manager. He is the manager of Andorran club Santa Coloma.

During his 16-year senior career, he was mainly associated with Dynamo Moscow (four seasons) and Sporting de Gijón (five). He was nicknamed the Bullet from Gorki, due to his speed.

Playing career

Club
Born in Gorky, Russian Soviet Federative Socialist Republic, Soviet Union, Cheryshev began his professional career with FC Khimik Dzerzhinsk in the third division, joining FC Lokomotiv Nizhny Novgorod in the second level in 1990. He played four seasons in the Russian Premier League with FC Dynamo Moscow, helping the capital club to two top-three finishes and winning the 1995 Russian Cup.

In 1996, Cheryshev scored a career-best 17 goals with Dynamo, who eventually finished fourth. Subsequently, he moved to Spain and signed for Sporting de Gijón, where he would share teams with several compatriots; he made his debut in La Liga on 17 November 1996, playing 30 minutes in a 2–4 home loss against Athletic Bilbao– the Asturians would be relegated at the end of the 1997–98 season.

Cheryshev continued to net regularly for Sporting in his division two spell. He ended his career also in the country, after one-season stints with Burgos CF (second tier) and Real Aranjuez CF (amateurs).

International
Cheryshev made his debut for CIS on 25 January 1992, in a friendly with the United States. During four years he was also capped for Russia, scoring his only international goal in a UEFA Euro 1996 qualifier against San Marino.

Coaching career
Cheryshev worked as a manager with Real Madrid during two years, being in charge of one of its children's teams. After acting briefly as director of football with FC Sibir Novosibirsk, he was appointed head coach at FC Volga Nizhny Novgorod, helping the team narrowly retain their top-flight status.

In late October 2014, Cheryshev was appointed as manager of Kazakhstan Premier League side FC Irtysh Pavlodar on a two-year contract. He was relieved of his duties in May of the following year, being immediately signed to Unai Emery's staff at Sevilla FC.

On 3 June 2016, Cheryshev was named coach of FC Mordovia Saransk, recently relegated from the Premier League. Ahead of the 2018–19 season he was hired by FC Nizhny Novgorod, leading them to the promotion play-offs but losing to PFC Krylia Sovetov Samara. On 16 October 2019, he left by mutual consent.

On 21 September 2021, Cheryshev was named head coach of AFC Eskilstuna in Sweden, he was their coach for three hours until he left his first and only training - the barrier of language was a big problem and he felt he couldn't change that much in the club as he wanted.

On 9 August 2022, Cheryshev was hired as the manager of Santa Coloma in Andorra.

Personal life
Cheryshev's son, Denis, is also a footballer. A winger, he played youth football for two of the teams his father represented in Spain, and also spent several seasons with Real Madrid.

Career statistics

Club

* – played games and goals

International goals

Honours

Club
Dynamo Moscow
Russian Cup: 1994–95

Individual
Top 33 players year-end list: 1992, 1994, 1996

References

External links
RussiaTeam biography and profile 

1969 births
Living people
Sportspeople from Nizhny Novgorod
Soviet footballers
Russian footballers
Association football forwards
Soviet First League players
Russian Premier League players
FC Khimik Dzerzhinsk players
FC Lokomotiv Nizhny Novgorod players
FC Dynamo Moscow players
La Liga players
Segunda División players
Sporting de Gijón players
Burgos CF footballers
Russia international footballers
Dual internationalists (football)
Russian expatriate footballers
Expatriate footballers in Spain
Russian expatriate sportspeople in Spain
Russian football managers
Russian Premier League managers
FC Volga Nizhny Novgorod managers
FC Mordovia Saransk managers
Russian expatriate football managers
Expatriate football managers in Kazakhstan
Russian expatriate sportspeople in Kazakhstan
Real Madrid CF non-playing staff
Expatriate football managers in Andorra
Russian expatriate sportspeople in Andorra